Jagat Singh Sidhu( 1901/02–1931/32), better known as Jagga Jatt or Jagga Daku, was a 20th-century heroic rebel of Punjab. He is known as the Robin Hood of Punjab for "robbing from the rich and giving to the poor", as is typically believed about Robin Hood as well.

Early life
Jagga was born as Jagat Singh Sidhu in 1901/02 in a Sidhu Jat family, in Dasuwal, Punjab to father Sardar Makhan Singh Sidhu and mother Bhagan, in British India. In village Burj Ran Singh, most families were Muslim Telis and only 17 or 18 families were of Sidhu Jats . Jagga had two sisters and he was the only son of Makhan Singh. Jagga owned 10 Murabba (250 acres) of land so he was not asked to do much work by his uncle and mother.

Sardar Makhan Singh Sidhu and Bhaagan had six children before Jagga but none of them survived. At this, Makhan Singh went to a saint Inder Singh, in the nearby village of Sodhi Wala, who told him to buy a buck (male goat) before the birth of the next baby and told him that the buck should be touched by the newly born. The saint also told him not to name the baby starting with J.

However, the child was born and finally survived with the subsequent death of the buck touched by him, but an uncle of the child insisted on naming the child as Jagat Singh which was against the directions of the saint.

Jagga's father died when Jagga was a little child. He grew up in the care of his Chacha (uncle) Roop Singh Sidhu and mother Bhagan.
He was very fond of wrestling and used to wrestle at the village akhara with his friend Sohan Teli. He married Inder Kaur of the nearby village of Talwandi and the couple was blessed with the only daughter Gulab Kaur a.k.a. Gabo. After the partition of India, Jagga Jatt's uncle's (Sardar Roop Singh Sidhu) bloodline moved to Dugri village (Jalandhar).

Personality
Jagga had a strong body, medium height, wheatish skin color, double-ringed whiskers, and independent nature. Once he had beaten up the proud Nakaii brothers who used to live at his In-law's village. Jagga had a verbal argument with a patwari (Land officer) who refused to provide data regarding his land. When the land officer refused to give data then Jagga threw record books hither-thither. Seeing this the land officer agreed to give data. Jagga became quite famous for his independent nature and strong body in the nearby villages.

Becoming an outlaw
During the British colonial rule every person of guts and independent nature especially young men were watched carefully by the British because he might be dangerous to the British Government's authority. Jagga's fame in the area resulted in attracting the jealousy of a Zaildar of Kal Mokal village. He considered Jagga's fame a challenge to him and got Jagga imprisoned in a false case for 4 years. Later when Jagga was released and came back home, an incident of theft happened in the nearby village of Bhai Pheru. The Zaildar with his friend inspector Asgar Ali misused this incident as another chance to harass Jagga and the inspector told Jagga to be present at the police station regarding the case. Many of Jagga's friends and well-wishers tried to persuade Jagga but he declined and went underground and became an outlaw.

Becoming a rebel
Being angry about the police's behavior he snatched a rifle from a policeman at Kanganpur village and killed him. From that day he became a bandit and started robbing at gunpoint, but he robbed only the rich to help the poor and needy. The first banditry he made was at Ghumiari village (at the border of Kasur and Lahore districts) at a goldsmith's house with his friends Jhanda Singh Nirmal Ke and Thakur Singh Mandeyali. They robbed the gold and lit fire to the ledgers that had the loan records of the poor people. Later he established his group and his new friends were Banta Singh, his childhood friend Sohan Teli, Lalu Nai, Bholu and Bawa. Lalu Nai used to cook food for the group.

Death
Jagga was killed by treachery in 1932 at the age of 29 years.

There was another famous bandit, Mallangi, in the nearby village of Sidhupur. Mallangi belonged to a Muslim family and his close friend Harnam Singh was from a poor farming family. Once a man informed the police about Mallangi's location resulting in the death of Mallangi and his friend Harnam Singh in an encounter by police and Mallangi's sister and brother was murdered with his father dying with the shock.

As this news reached Jagga he went to visit Mallangi's blind and mournfull mother. Deciding to spend the noon there he asked Lalu Nai, the cook, to arrange food. Lalu called his brothers from his village nearby to kill Jagga for reward. Lalu told them to have wine with him. Jagga and Banta decided to have a drink before the meal but Sohan Teli refused as he claimed he had to visit the nearby village to meet his friend. Finally Jagga and Banta got intoxicated with alcohol and slept under the Boharh (Banyan) tree and Sohan Teli went to his friend. Taking advantage of this moment, Lalu Nai and his brothers shot the intoxicated Jagga and Banta. On hearing the gunshot, Sohan came back but was shot dead when he tried to attack Lalu on seeing the bloody bodies. 

This is mentioned in a song too:

Transliteration jagga waddhia boharh di chhaven, nau man ret bhijj gai poorna, naeeaan ne waddh chhaddia jagga soorma.

But the most believe the folklore that British rulers attacked his house, killed people and burnt the houses around as well threatened Jagga Singh after they couldn't find him. Jagat Singh decided to avenge this when he came back from kabaddi match. He sent a message to the British lord ( of the time) that he will go to his house, will dine with their queens and bring them with him in his village to show British Empire the dignity and power of " Jagga Jutt " for sake of respect of his nation. English blocked all the ways to the lord's house except one way via wooden bridge.

That was the time when they decided to buy a person whose nickname was Blaaki Nai and Jagga's beloved girl, daughter of Blaaki Nai Billo. One day, Jagga went to their place to see "Billo" and also get a shave as well. As he sat on the available seat, in front of Blaaki Nai for the shave, Blaaki gave a Sharp cut on "Jagga Singh's) throat. Jagga Singh hardly could manage to fight back and died after killing Blaaki Nai and his daughter "Billo".

That why poet Said ; 
" Naayian Waddh Suttya Jagga Soorma  (the Nai's killed the sleeping Jagga) "

"Waddh" means to cut, not shot.

This can roughly be translated to: They murdered Jagga under a banyan tree, 9 man (a unit of weight measurement in Punjab) sand soaked his blood! O Lord, Nai (a caste or tribe of people. People of Nai caste profession is barber and in Punjab, as well they also cook food for any function like marriage or death) killed Jagga Warrior in cold blood.

As the news of Jagga's death spread, shocked people refused to believe it. British rulers rewarded his traitor Lallu Nai with ten murabas (250 acres) farmland and a horse. Lallu Nai was eventually jailed by the government in another unrelated case, where he was killed by a fellow prisoner Nahid from Malerkotla.

Family
Jagga's only child, a daughter named Gulab Kaur was born around 1919 and was nicknamed Gabbo. She was renamed by her in-laws to Resham Kaur at the time of her marriage. Before his death, Jagga had arranged for his daughter to be married to Avtar Singh, who was a nephew of Jagga's dacoit friend Kehar Singh.  Jagga's son-in-law Avtar Singh died in 2005 Banwala Anu village in Malout tehsil of Sri Muktsar Sahib district and his daughter still lives there. Interviews of his daughter had published in several newspapers. Jagga's wife Inder Kaur also died in the same village Banwala Anu in 1983.

In popular media
He is the central heroic topic of songs by Punjabi and Bollywood songs. Several Punjabi movies had been made on his story, including Jagga starring Dara Singh and 1991 film "Badla Jatti Da" starring Guggu Gill.

See also
 Paan Singh Tomar
 Phoolan Devi
 Seema Parihar
 Veerappan

References

Punjabi people
Indian Sikhs
Indian robbers
Outlaws
Deaths by firearm in India
People from Kasur District